Salair is a town administratively subordinated to Guryevsk Town Under Oblast Jurisdiction in Kemerovo Oblast, Russia, located  south of Kemerovo, the administrative center of the oblast. Population:

History
It was founded in 1626 as the village of Salairskoye on the Malaya Tolmovaya River. Town status was granted to it in 1941.

Administrative and municipal status
Within the framework of administrative divisions, it is, together with two rural localities, incorporated as the town of district significance of Salair, which is subordinated to Guryevsk Town Under Oblast Jurisdiction—an administrative unit with a status equal to that of the districts. As a municipal division, the town of district significance of Salair is incorporated within Guryevsky Municipal District as Salairskoye Urban Settlement.

See also
Salair Ridge

References

Notes

Sources

Cities and towns in Kemerovo Oblast
Monotowns in Russia